Lake Pucacocha (possibly from Quechua puka red, qucha lake, "red lake") is a lake in the Cordillera Blanca in the Andes of  Peru. Pukaqucha is located in the Ancash Region, Huaylas Province, Yuracmarca District, northwest of the highest peak of Pucajirca (Quechua for "red mountain").

References 

Lakes of Peru
Lakes of Ancash Region